The Grandfather (Spanish:El abuelo) is a 1925 Spanish silent drama film directed by José Buchs and starring Modesto Rivas, Doris Wilton and Celia Escudero.

Cast
 Modesto Rivas as Conde de Albrit  
 Doris Wilton as Veraneante  
 Celia Escudero as Nelly  
 Arturo de la Riva as Pío Coronado  
 María Comendador as Gregoria  
 Ana de Leyva as Condesa Lucrecia de Ritchmon  
 Alejandro Navarro as Venancio  
 Juan Francés as Amigo del conde  
 Francisco Martí as Prior del convento  
 Cecilio Rodríguez de la Vega as Cura  
 Emilio Ruiz Santiago as Senén 
 Enrique Ponte as Alcalde de Jerusa 
 Fernando Roldán as Carlos Erasiel y Cura

References

Bibliography
  Eva Woods Peiró. White Gypsies: Race and Stardom in Spanish Musical Films. U of Minnesota Press, 2012.

External links

1925 films
Spanish silent films
Films based on works by Benito Pérez Galdós
Films directed by José Buchs
Spanish black-and-white films
Spanish drama films
1925 drama films
Silent drama films
1920s Spanish-language films